Euchroma is a genus of beetles in the family Buprestidae.

This genus has one species:

 Euchroma gigantea (Linnaeus, 1758)

See also
 EUROCROMA

References

Monotypic Buprestidae genera